The Sanigut Islands are an uninhabited island group in the Qikiqtaaluk Region of Nunavut, Canada. They are located in Baffin Island's Cumberland Sound, just south of Avataktoo Bay. Aupaluktok Island is the southern one. Anarnittuq Island, Beacon Island, Imigen Island, Ivisa Island, Kekertelung Island, Saunik Island, Tesseralik Island, and Ugpitimik Island are in the vicinity.

References

External links 
 Sanigut Islands in the Atlas of Canada - Toporama; Natural Resources Canada

Archipelagoes of Baffin Island
Archipelagoes of the Canadian Arctic Archipelago
Islands of Cumberland Sound
Uninhabited islands of Qikiqtaaluk Region